Phytoandrogens are substances produced in plants which have effects similar to testosterone in animals.

Examples
 Triterpenoids from the Eucommia ulmoides tree can act as phytoandrogens.
 Drupanol is a phytoandrogen.
 Tribulus terrestris
 Brazilian Ginseng

Environmental effects
Phytoandrogens have been implicated in sex-reversal in fish.

See also
Phytoestrogen
Plant hormone

References 

Androgens and anabolic steroids
Phytochemicals